Ctenophthalmus is a genus of fleas in the family Hystrichopsyllidae.

References

External links 

 
 
 Ctenophthalmus at insectoid.info

Hystrichopsyllidae
Siphonaptera genera
Taxa named by Friedrich August Rudolph Kolenati